Dane Cook: Vicious Circle is a live stand-up comedy special performed for HBO written and produced by Dane Cook. It was aired on September 4, 2006. It was then released on DVD November 28, 2006, with the tagline, "What goes around has come around." The DVD includes the original unaired version and a "DANEgerous" edition.

CD and DVD release
Vicious Circle was also released in a box set in a CD format along with the DVD, the Dane Cook's Tourgasm DVD and a SUFI hat around the same time Rough Around The Edges came out.

To coincide with the network television premiere of Dane Cook: Vicious Circle (Sunday, January 27, 2008), Comedy Central Records released the uncut audio of Vicious Circle the following Tuesday (January 29) through digital music vendors, such as iTunes.

Track listing

DANEgerous
 Intro – 2:25
 The Truth About Lying – 8:32
 My One Regret – 5:36
 Painful Shits – 0:43
 I Did My Best – 9:13
 The Atheist – 9:18
 My Son Optimus Prime – 1:26
 The Robe – 3:52
 B&E – 9:46
 Kidnapped – 3:46
 Hopes N Dreams – 3:37
 Jake-Uh – 1:58
 The Game of Love and How to Destroy It – 22:05
 Post-Battle Sex – 0:39
 Cheater 2.0 – 11:50
 Cinematic Adventures – 12:11
 Birthday Girl – 1:34
 One Night Stand – 3:32
 DJ Diddles – 10:06
 Goodnights – 1:17
 Encore – 2:41
 I'll Never Be You – 4:58

Edited
 Intro – 2:37
 The Truth About Lying – 8:32
 I Did My Best – 9:20
 The Atheist – 9:19
 My Son Optimus Prime – 0:38
 Robe – 3:52
 B&E – 8:41
 Jake-Uh – 1:58
 Bad Relationships – 9:53
 Post-Battle Sex – 0:39
 Cheater 2.0 – 11:50
 Cinematic Adventures – 12:11
 One Night Stand / DJ Diddles – 12:52
 Goodnights – 2:55

References

External links
 
 Vicious Circle at HBO.com

American documentary films
2000s English-language films
2006 live albums
Live video albums
2006 video albums
Comedy Central Records video albums
Comedy Central Records live albums
Stand-up comedy albums
Spoken word albums by American artists
Live spoken word albums
Stand-up comedy on DVD
2000s comedy albums